Fowl Play is Sister Sparrow & the Dirty Birds' first and so far their only live album, released on March 4, 2016 on Party Fowl Records, Thirty Tigers. The album was recorded on New Year's Eve, 2015, although not in the originally planned venue, Daryl's House in New York (Daryl Hall's concert venue). Just a month in advance of their concert, Daryl decided to play that night at his joint, and the Dirty Bird's concert was canceled, and the band had to scramble to find another hall to play in for their planned recorded concert. They managed to land on their feet at the Warehouse at the Fairfield Theatre Co. in Connecticut and still sold out in advance.

Track list
 All tracks written by Arleigh Kincheloe, except where noted

Disc One

Disc Two

References

2016 albums
Live albums by American artists
Sister Sparrow & the Dirty Birds albums